Janbechynea is a genus of leaf beetles in the family Orsodacnidae. There are at least 12 described species in Janbechynea, found in North America. The genus is named after the Czech entomologist Jan Bechyně.

Species
These 12 species belong to the genus Janbechynea:

Subgenus Janbechynea
 Janbechynea elongata (Jacoby, 1888)
 Janbechynea inversosimilis Monrós, 1954
 Janbechynea julioi Santiago-Blay, 2004
 Janbechynea maldonadoi Santiago-Blay, 2004
 Janbechynea paradoxa Monrós, 1953
 Janbechynea snyderae Santiago-Blay, 2004
 Janbechynea woodburyi Santiago-Blay, 2004
Subgenus Bothroscelis Monrós, 1954 (type species: Aulacoscelis fulvipes Jacoby, 1888)
 Janbechynea fulvipes (Jacoby, 1888)
 Janbechynea georgepauljohnringo Santiago-Blay, 2004
 Janbechynea melyroides (Crowson, 1946)
 Janbechynea suzanita Santiago-Blay, 2004
 Janbechynea virkkii Santiago-Blay, 2004

References

Further reading

 

Orsodacnidae
Articles created by Qbugbot